Stephen Hartley Roach (born 20 June 1958) is a former Australian rules footballer who played with Richmond, Collingwood and St Kilda in the Victorian Football League (VFL).

Roach, a utility from Jordanville, played just two senior games for Richmond in 1978. He did however finish third in Gardiner Medal voting for his efforts in the reserves. The utility made his way to Collingwood in 1979 and with the club making the grand final in both of his two seasons, Roach found it difficult to command regular selection. After playing briefly with St Kilda, Roach went on to become captain and coach of the Oakleigh Football Club.

References

1958 births
Australian rules footballers from Melbourne
Richmond Football Club players
Collingwood Football Club players
St Kilda Football Club players
Oakleigh Football Club players
Oakleigh Football Club coaches
Living people